The Estufa is a historic structure on the University of New Mexico campus in Albuquerque, New Mexico. It was built in 1907–08 by a local social fraternity and has served since 1915 as the primary meeting location of the university's Pi Kappa Alpha chapter. The building's history is steeped in fraternity lore and supposedly no woman has ever seen its interior. It is listed in both the New Mexico State Register of Cultural Properties and the National Register of Historic Places.

The Estufa is modeled after a kiva, a ceremonial meeting place used by the Pueblo people. It has thick adobe walls and contains a single windowless room with seating around the edges. Construction of the building was guided by university president William G. Tight, who promoted the use of Pueblo Revival architecture on campus. The Estufa was one of the first buildings in New Mexico to employ this style.

Name

An estufa [Sp., a stove, a warm room. Cf. Stove] is an assembly room in a dwelling of the Pueblo Indians (i.e. a kiva), per Webster's Revised Unabridged Dictionary, 1998.

History
The Estufa was built in 1907–08 by the local social fraternity Alpha Alpha Alpha, previously known as the Yum Yum Society. The project received support from university president William G. Tight, who was interested in strengthening the Greek system on campus. At the same time, Tight had been working to promote Pueblo Revival architecture at the university and had already overseen construction of two new dormitories and a boiler plant in the Pueblo style. Under this influence, the Tri-Alphas built their meeting room in the form of a kiva or "estufa," a traditional feature of Pueblo architecture.

Ground was broken on the project in January 1907, though the work evidently proceeded slowly and it was not finished until April 1908. The U.N.M. Weekly student newspaper reported that month that

The Tri-Alphas held their first meeting in the Estufa on February 20, 1908, while the building was still unfinished. In 1915, Alpha Alpha Alpha became the Beta Delta chapter of Pi Kappa Alpha, the university's first national fraternity, and the Estufa has continued to serve as the chapter's primary meeting location for nearly 100 years. During its long history as a fraternity council room, the Estufa has been involved in numerous pranks and has been broken into or vandalized many times, often by the rival Sigma Chi fraternity. The building is accessible only to members of Pi Kappa Alpha, and according to fraternity lore no woman has ever seen its interior.

The Estufa has survived both accidental and intentional vehicular collisions as well as "attempts to destroy it with fire, dynamite, water and other weapons" according to an Albuquerque Journal article from 1952. In 1947 alone, the building was set on fire four times. It was also damaged by an accidental gas explosion in 1958 that left five people injured. In the 1960s, the building seemed doomed by a University Boulevard widening project, but city planners ultimately chose a road alignment further to the west that kept the Estufa out of harm's way. It was added to the New Mexico State Register of Cultural Properties and the National Register of Historic Places in 1988.

Architecture
The Estufa is an elliptical, one-story building loosely modeled after a kiva at Santo Domingo Pueblo. As such, it was one of the earliest expressions of the Pueblo Revival style in New Mexico, and is the oldest surviving example at UNM. The building was originally accessed via an external staircase and roof trapdoor, but this arrangement has since been replaced by a more conventional door.

Despite the prevalence of Pueblo style architecture at UNM, the Estufa is one of only two buildings on campus actually made out of adobe. The other is the Naval Science Building designed by John Gaw Meem.

References

External links

Photo and article on the Estufa

Buildings and structures completed in 1908
Buildings and structures in Albuquerque, New Mexico
Clubhouses on the National Register of Historic Places in New Mexico
Pueblo Revival architecture in Albuquerque, New Mexico
Adobe buildings and structures in New Mexico
University of New Mexico
New Mexico State Register of Cultural Properties
National Register of Historic Places in Albuquerque, New Mexico
1908 establishments in New Mexico Territory